

2012–13 Top 3 Standings

Events summary

Standings

References

Overall Women